State Route 55 (SR 55) is an 18-mile (30-km) long north–south state highway that passes through suburban Orange County in the U.S. state of California. The portion of the route built to freeway standards is known as the Costa Mesa Freeway (formerly the Newport Freeway). SR 55 runs between Via Lido south of Pacific Coast Highway (SR 1) in Newport Beach and the Riverside Freeway (SR 91) in Anaheim to the north, intersecting other major Orange County freeways such as SR 22, SR 73, and Interstate 405 (I-405).

SR 55 was first added to the state highway system in 1931, known as part of Legislative Route 43, and was routed on surface streets. It was renumbered SR 55 in 1959, and the construction of the freeway portion began in the 1960s and continued until 1992. Due to congestion, several alternatives are being discussed to expand the freeway portion past its current end in Newport Beach. SR 55 received the first carpool lane in Orange County in 1985, and the first direct carpool ramp in 1995.

Route description
It then follows a traditional street routing through a retail and commercial section of Costa Mesa until its intersection with 19th Street. The segment on Newport Boulevard includes a limited-access interchange at SR 1. Following the 19th Street intersection, SR 55 becomes an eight-lane below-grade freeway that bisects the northbound and southbound lanes of Newport Boulevard until the Mesa Drive undercrossing.

North of Fair Drive, SR 55 is an at-grade or above-grade freeway, with the exception of a  stretch between the 1st Street/4th Street exit and the 17th Street exit in Santa Ana, which is below-grade. SR 55 intersects SR 73 and I-405 next to John Wayne Airport. The freeway continues north into Santa Ana and Tustin, where there is an interchange with I-5. Southbound SR 55 does not have a direct link to northbound I-5.

SR 55 continues north into Orange, where it meets the eastern terminus of SR 22. Following this, the freeway continues almost due north until reaching its northern terminus at SR 91 near the Santa Ana River. After the last exit, Lincoln Avenue and Nohl Ranch Road, there is an entrance to the 91 Express Lanes from the HOV lane.

Today, SR 55 is a heavily travelled corridor linking southern Orange County with SR 91, the main corridor between the Inland Empire and the Los Angeles Metropolitan Area, as well as I-5, the main north–south corridor for California. A HOV lane has been built along the entire freeway portion from I-405 to SR 91, with some direct access ramps, including one for I-5. However, congestion is still very prevalent throughout the day, as is the norm with many Orange County freeways; Route 55 experiences a peak daily traffic volume of 262,000 vehicles and 17,292 trucks.

SR 55 is part of the California Freeway and Expressway System, and is part of the National Highway System, a network of highways that are considered essential to the country's economy, defense, and mobility by the Federal Highway Administration. SR 55 from SR 91 to Costa Mesa is known as the Costa Mesa Freeway, as named by Assembly Concurrent Resolution 177, Chapter 86 in 1976.

History

SR 55 was built in 1931 and originally numbered Route 43. It was built from the southern terminus of SR 1 (the Pacific Coast Highway, or "PCH") and continued northbound on roughly the same route it follows today, following Newport Road (today Newport Boulevard) northeast to Tustin, and then Tustin Avenue north to near its current terminus at SR 91. From here, Route 43 continued east on what is now SR 91 towards Riverside. In 1959, the highway was renumbered as Route 55, and its route was shortened from Route 1 to the also-renumbered Route 91. The freeway portion from Chapman Avenue to SR 91 opened on January 18, 1962, at a cost of $4.6 million (equivalent to $ in ). The segment between SR 73 and Chapman Avenue opened in 1966.

SR 55 was the first freeway in Orange County to receive carpool lanes, opened in October 1985 between I-405 and SR 91. The stretch of SR 55 between Mesa Drive and 19th Street in Costa Mesa was opened in 1992; plans to extend SR 55 freeway south from 19th Street to State Route 1 were never realized due to community opposition, fueling an amendment to the city charter to prevent this extension.

In 1995, the direct carpool lane ramps between I-5 and SR 55 were completed; these were the first in Orange County. The year also saw further widening of SR 55 between SR 22 and McFadden Avenue. Between 1996 and 2002, the fifth lane in both directions was constructed between I-5 and SR 91, funded with a sales tax of half a cent approved by Measure M. In April 2007, the Orange County Transportation Authority approved funds to study the feasibility of extending the Costa Mesa Freeway south to 17th Street via tunnels or flyover ramps. The segment of SR 55 from Finley Street to the Newport Channel bridge was legally authorized to be turned over to the city of Newport Beach in 2009.

In the mid 2000s, Caltrans began adding the city of Anaheim as a control city on State Route 55 North. Signs that mention State Route 55 North would have the newer reflective posting pasted over the button sign or would be replaced with a new one that says "Anaheim/Riverside" to reflect this change.

SR 55 was formerly called the Newport Freeway. In 2010, the stretch between Chapman and Katella Avenues in the City of Orange was renamed the Paul Johnson Freeway for longtime local radio and television traffic reporter Paul Johnson, who died the same year.

On May 21, 2021, a road rage incident occurred in which the perpetrator fatally shot 6-year-old Aiden Leos, a passenger in his mother's car as it was traveling on the 55 Freeway. On June 6, Marcus Anthony Eriz and Wynne Lee were arrested in connection with the death. Both suspects pleaded not guilty in court on June 18.

Exit list

See also

References

External links

California @ AARoads.com - State Route 55
Caltrans: Route 55 highway conditions
California Highways: SR 55

055
055
State Route 055
Newport Beach, California
Transportation in Anaheim, California
Costa Mesa, California